Triandomelaena is a genus of tephritid  or fruit flies in the family Tephritidae.

Species
Triandomelaena albinus (Bezzi, 1924)
Triandomelaena brevicostalis Hancock, 1986

References

Tephritinae
Tephritidae genera
Diptera of Africa